Tibolci (in older sources also Tibavci,  is a settlement on the left bank of the Pesnica River in the Municipality of Gorišnica in northeastern Slovenia. The area traditionally belonged to the Styria region. It is now included in the Drava Statistical Region.

There is a small chapel-shrine with a belfry in the settlement. It was built in 1921.

References

External links
Tibolci on Geopedia

Populated places in the Municipality of Gorišnica